The Iowa Falls Bridge, also known as the Oak Street Bridge, was a historic structure located in Iowa Falls, Iowa, United States. The through arch bridge was built by the Weldon Brothers Construction Co. of Iowa Falls in 1928 for $51,374.98. At the time it was completed the bridge was the longest arch span in the state of Iowa. It was listed on the National Register of Historic Places in 1998. The historic bridge was demolished and replaced in 2010.

References

External links

Bridges completed in 1928
Bridges in Hardin County, Iowa
Iowa Falls, Iowa
National Register of Historic Places in Hardin County, Iowa
Road bridges on the National Register of Historic Places in Iowa
Arch bridges in Iowa
Through arch bridges in the United States